Beatrice "Trix" Wolstenholme (later Whalen, 1920 – 5 October 2008) was an English freestyle swimmer who competed in the 1934 British Empire Games.

She was born in Withington, Manchester and was the younger sister of Cecelia Wolstenholme.

At the 1934 Empire Games she was a member of the English relay team which won the bronze medal in the 4×110 yards freestyle event.

External links
guardian.co.uk Obituary
Obituary Beatrice "Trix" Whalen

1920 births
2008 deaths
English female swimmers
English female freestyle swimmers
Swimmers at the 1934 British Empire Games
Commonwealth Games bronze medallists for England
Commonwealth Games medallists in swimming
People from Withington
20th-century English women
21st-century English women
Medallists at the 1934 British Empire Games